Eucalyptus trivalva, commonly known as Victoria Spring mallee or desert mallee, is a species of mallee or small tree that is endemic to arid areas of central Australia. It has rough, partly shed bark on some or all of the trunk, smooth bark above, lance-shaped to elliptical adult leaves, flower buds in groups of nine or eleven, white flowers and cup-shaped, cylindrical or conical fruit.

Description
It has loose, rough, fibrous, grey to dark grey-brown bark on some or all of the lower stems, smooth coppery to grey or cream-coloured bark above and yellowish branchlets. Flowering occurs between January and August and the flowers are white.

Taxonomy and naming
Eucalyptus trivalva was first formally described by the botanist William Blakely in 1936 in an article published in Transactions and Proceedings of the Royal Society of South Australia. The specific epithet (trivalva) is taken from Latin words meaning "three" and meaning "valve", referring to the three-valved fruits produced by this species.

In 1988, George Chippendale changed the name to Eucalyptus trivalvis, (meaning "three-valved", as distinct from "three valve") in Flora of Australia but the change is not accepted by the Australian Plant Census.

Distribution
Victoria Spring mallee is found in arid and semi-arid areas on sand plains, dunes and ridges in central Australia. In Western Australia it is found in central parts of the Goldfields-Esperance, Pilbara, and Mid West regions from around Newman in the north to Kalgoorlie in the south. In the Northern Territory it is found south from near Alice Springs and in South Australia in western parts in open mallee vegetation on gravelly sands and on rocky rises.

See also
List of Eucalyptus species

References

Eucalypts of Western Australia
Trees of Australia
trivalva
Myrtales of Australia
Plants described in 1936
Flora of South Australia
Flora of the Northern Territory
Taxa named by William Blakely